is a trans-Neptunian object orbiting the Sun. However, with a semi-major axis of 30.8 AU, the object is actually a jumping Neptune trojan, co-orbital with Neptune, as the giant planet has a similar semi-major axis of 30.1 AU. The body is jumping from the Lagrangian point  into  via . , it is 54 AU from Neptune. By 2070, it will be 69 AU from Neptune.

Discovery
 was discovered on 7 March 2010, by David L. Rabinowitz and Suzanne W. Tourtellotte using the 1.3-meter Small and Medium Research Telescope System (SMARTS) at Cerro Tololo Observatory in Chile.

Orbit
 follows a rather eccentric orbit (0.31) with a semi-major axis of 30.72 AU and an inclination of 19.3º. Its orbit is well determined with images dating back to 1989.

Physical properties
 is a quite large minor body with an absolute magnitude of 7.17 and an estimated diameter of  based on an assumed albedo of 0.08.

Jumping trojan
 is another co-orbital of Neptune, the second brightest after the quasi-satellite .  is currently transitioning from librating around Lagrangian point L4 to librating around L5. This unusual trojan-like behavior is termed "jumping trojan".

Numbering and naming 

This minor planet was numbered by the Minor Planet Center on 7 February 2012. , it has not been named. If named, it will follow the naming scheme already established with 385571 Otrera and 385695 Clete, which is to name these objects after figures related to the Amazons, an all-female warrior tribe that fought in the Trojan War on the side of the Trojans against the Greek.

References

External links 
 List of Centaurs and Scattered Disk Objects, Minor Planet Center
 List of Trans Neptunian Objects, Minor Planet Center
 

316179
Discoveries by David L. Rabinowitz
Discoveries by Suzanne W. Tourtellotte
20100307